Mayhem on a Sunday Afternoon was the last of three documentaries William Friedkin made for producer David Wolper. It concerned the world of pro football.

See also
List of American films of 1965

References

Friedkin, William, The Friedkin Connection, HarperCollins 2013

External links
Mayhem on a Sunday Afternoon at David L. Wolper

1965 films
Films directed by William Friedkin
1965 documentary films
American documentary television films
Documentary films about American football
1965 television films
1960s American films